"Lady Windermere's Fan" (Spanish: El abanico de Lady Windermere) is a 1944 Mexican film, directed by Juan José Ortega.

Plot
Lady Windermere discovers that her husband may have a mistress.  When confronted, her husband dismisses the accusations and invites his supposed lover, Mrs. Erlyne, to Windermer's birthday dance.  Lady Windermere, upset by her husband's suspected infidelity, runs away with Lord Darlington after he confesses his love for her.

Cast
Anita Blanch
Diana Bordes
René Cardona
Ángel Di Stefani
Mercedes Ferriz
Miguel Ángel Ferriz
Emma Fink
Emilia Guiú
Susana Guízar
Raúl Lechuga
Héctor López Portillo
Augusto Novaro
Alfonso Ruiz Gómez
Fanny Schiller
Arturo Soto Rangel
Dolores Tinoco
Aurora Zermeño

External links

Plot

1940s Spanish-language films
Mexican black-and-white films
1944 films
Films based on Lady Windermere's Fan
Mexican drama films
1944 drama films
1940s Mexican films